Three Embarcadero Center is an office skyscraper located in San Francisco's Financial District. The building is part of the Embarcadero Center, which is a complex of six interconnected buildings and one off-site extension. The skyscraper, completed in 1977, stands  with 31 stories. Three Embarcadero Center stands at the same height as Two Embarcadero Center, although this building has one more floor.

See also
 San Francisco's tallest buildings

References

Further reading

External links
 Embarcadero Center official web site

Financial District, San Francisco
Skyscraper office buildings in San Francisco
Twin towers
1970s architecture in the United States
John C. Portman Jr. buildings
Office buildings completed in 1977
1977 establishments in California